Theophylact or Theophylaktos (d. 845 AD) became bishop of Nicomedia in Asia Minor following the Iconoclastic Controversy of the eighth century.

He was well known for having built churches, hospices, and homes for wanderers. He generously distributed alms, was the guardian of orphans, widows and the sick, and personally attended those afflicted with leprosy, not hesitating to wash their wounds. During the iconoclast reign of Leo the Armenian (813-820 AD), Theophylaktos argued vigorously for the use of art in the Church. The emperor  sent him into exile for his disagreement.

He is recognized as a Saint in the Eastern Orthodox Church for his tireless defense of the faith, for miraculous deeds attributed to him, and for his Christian spirit.

His life is commemorated on March 8.

References
Orthodox Church in America

External links
  St. Theophylact
Saints.SQPN: Theophylact of Nicomedia

Byzantine saints of the Eastern Orthodox Church
Eastern Catholic saints
9th-century Christian saints
Byzantine Iconoclasm
Byzantine saints
Saints from Anatolia
Bishops of Nicomedia
9th-century Byzantine bishops